East Perth Locomotive Depot (also known as East Perth loco sheds)  was a major steam locomotive depot for the Western Australian Government Railways from a year before the end of the First World War in 1917 until the end of the steam railway era on its railway system in 1970/1971.
The previous locomotive depot had been located west of the Perth railway station.

It was also commonly known as East Perth loco sheds and also the East Perth Depot.

The depot was operational from 1917.  There was a turntable at the western end of the yard.
It was located just east of the main railway terminus for the system at what is now Perth station. It was removed in 1969 to make way for the new East Perth railway station and the Westrail Centre that centralised railway administration offices of the government railway system, that had previously been scattered around a large number of buildings near the Perth station.

In the late twentieth century numbers of former employees who had worked at the depot, were interviewed for the oral history record.

Organised labour had reason to strike and raise issues of conditions during the existence of the depot. Some complaints had also been made collectively without union involvement.

Notes

Railway workshops in Western Australia
East Perth, Western Australia
Demolished buildings and structures in Western Australia
Buildings and structures demolished in 1969